Claude Patry (born January 10, 1953) is a former Canadian Member of Parliament for the riding of Jonquière—Alma, who served a single term from 2011 Canadian federal election until 2015. He was elected as a member of the New Democratic Party, but crossed over to the Bloc Québécois on February 28, 2013. He defeated incumbent MP Jean-Pierre Blackburn of the Conservative Party, who was Veterans Affairs Minister.

Patry was president of the Syndicat national des employés de l'aluminium d'Arvida, the union representing Rio Tinto Alcan workers in the riding.

Following his defection to the Bloc in 2013, Patry stated that "he voted for sovereignty in the 1980 and 1995 referendums and that he still hopes Quebec will one day become a country".

In August 2014, Patry announced that he was not running in the next federal election. He was rumoured to have considered resigning from the Bloc following the election of Mario Beaulieu as leader but remained with the party following the resignations of André Bellavance and Jean-François Fortin and was, with Louis Plamondon, one of two Bloc MPs until the House of Commons dissolved for the 2015 election.

It was reported in February 2017 that Patry had joined the militant far-right anti-Muslim group, La Meute (Wolf Pack) and is leader of the group's "clan" in the Saguenay–Lac-Saint-Jean region.

Electoral record

Source: Elections Canada

External links

References

Trade unionists from Quebec
Members of the House of Commons of Canada from Quebec
Bloc Québécois MPs
New Democratic Party MPs
Politicians from Saguenay, Quebec
Living people
1953 births
21st-century Canadian politicians